Electronic Music Foundation (EMF) is a not-for-profit 501(c)(3) organization that produces events, publishes and disseminates media and information, and provides access to materials relevant to the history and creative potential of electronic music.

The organization was founded in 1994 by composer Joel Chadabe.

In 2000, the EMF Institute website was created in order to provide public access to educational resources relating to electronic music.  The project was done in collaboration with the  UNESCO Digi-Arts portal.

References

External links 
 Electronic Music Foundation
 EMF Institute website

Electronic music organizations
Music organizations based in the United States
Organizations established in 1994
1994 establishments in the United States
501(c)(3) organizations